Shelling may refer to:
 Shell (projectile), explosive used in wars
 Searching for seashells
 Shelling (topology)
 Wheelset deformation, that occur when the wheel has been worn out
 Shelling (fishing), a fishing strategy used by dolphins.

See also